Rotterdam Blaak is a railway and metro station in Rotterdam, Netherlands. Located in the centre of the city, not far from the cube houses and the Markthal, the station is served by trains operating on the Breda–Rotterdam railway between Rotterdam Centraal and Dordrecht.

The first railway station at this location – then called Rotterdam Beurs – was opened on 2 May 1877. It formed part of a 2.2 km (1.4 mi) long viaduct. Destroyed during World War II, it was replaced by a new station, Rotterdam Blaak, in 1953.

The underground metro station opened on 6 May 1982, with space reserved for a possible underground railway station directly underneath it. On 15 September 1993, this new underground railway station was opened, as part of a 2.8 km (1.7 mi) long tunnel. This tunnel, including the station, had four tracks instead of the two on the viaduct. Train services are operated by Nederlandse Spoorwegen (NS).

Train services
The following services call at Rotterdam Blaak:
2x per hour national (Intercity) service from Amsterdam to Haarlem, Leiden, The Hague, Rotterdam, Dordrecht, Roosendaal and Vlissingen
2x per hour national (Intercity) service from Lelystad to Almere, Duivendrecht, Amsterdam Zuid, Schiphol Airport, Leiden, The Hague, Rotterdam and Dordrecht
4x per hour local service (Sprinter) from The Hague to Rotterdam and Dordrecht

Other public transport
The metro of lines A, B, and C call at the subway station, simply called Blaak.

Several Rotterdam tram and city bus lines call at the Rotterdam Blaak station. A tram stop is located between the entrances of the railway and the metro station, where line 21 and line 24 stop. All subway lines, trams and city buses are operated by RET

The routes of the city buses and trams are as follows:

External links
NS website 
Dutch Public Transport journey planner 

1877 establishments in the Netherlands
Blaak
Railway stations located underground in the Netherlands
Railway stations on the Staatslijn I
Railway stations opened in 1877
Blaak
Railway stations in the Netherlands opened in the 19th century